Aydın Gün;  (1917, Adana - November 30, 2007, Berlin), was a Turkish opera singer, stage director, founder and intendant of Istanbul Opera House.
He was a pioneering figure in the Turkish opera scene and a founding member of the IKSV.

References

1917 births
2007 deaths
20th-century Turkish male opera singers